Visions is the second studio album by British progressive metal band Haken. The album was released mostly for the attention of people at ProgPower USA on 17 September 2011, with an official release date set for 25 October 2011.

Unlike Aquarius, which was written mainly on the piano by Richard Henshall, Visions was mostly written on the guitar. As with the debut album, the members recorded their parts at home and then shared the files between them. The album features a string quartet and a French horn player mixed with synthetic string and brass sections. Both string and French horn arrangements were arranged by keyboardist Diego Tejeida and drummer Ray Hearne.

It is a concept album like its predecessor, telling the story of "a young boy who sees his own death in his dreams and believes it's going to happen and spends the rest of his life trying to avoid it." The multi-part closing track "Visions" signifies the end of the story having come full circle, referencing earlier musical themes and motifs. The track was written by vocalist Ross Jennings based on a premonition of his own death and it was the first song to be written, with the album growing around it. Like Aquarius, the album artwork was also created by Dennis Sibeijn.

The album is dedicated to the mother of guitarist Charlie Griffiths, who had died in 2011.

The song "Visions" contains a voice at the beginning reciting Segismundo's reflection from Pedro Calderón de la Barca's play Life is a Dream.

Track listing

Reception

Visions received high praise from Sea of Tranquility webzine. It was described as "a staggeringly brilliant example of progressive metal" by Pete Pardo and "probably the final progressive masterpiece of 2011" by Murat Batmaz. Eduardo Rivadavia of AllMusic gave the album a positive review saying, "Visions isn't exactly a proud new flagship in Her Royal Majesty's Progressive Rock (H.R.M.P.R.) navy, but it's pretty darn seaworthy nonetheless."

Personnel 

Haken
Ross Jennings – vocals
Richard "Hen" Henshall – guitar and keyboards
Charlie Griffiths – guitar
Raymond Hearne – drums, tuba, djembe, strings and french horn arrangements
Diego Tejeida – keyboards and sound design, strings and french horn arrangements
Tom Maclean – bass

Additional musicians
Lucy Butcher – cello
Alison Comerford – violin
Chris Currie – voices
Patrick Harrild – voices
Jennifer Murphey – violin
Joey 'Dah Lipz' Ryan – french horn
Martin Wray – viola

Production and design
John Papas – recording 
George Balston – recording 
Mark Rainbow – recording 
Jonny Abraham – recording 
Christian Moos – mixing
Alan Douches – mastering
Dennis Sibeijn – artwork, design
Neil Palfreyman – photography
Bo Hansen – photography
Daniel Grey – photography

Notes 

2011 albums
Concept albums
Haken (band) albums